The following are Ball State University presidents. Ball State is located in Muncie, Indiana.

William Wood Parsons (1918–1921)
Linnaeus Neal Hines (1921–1924)
Benjamin J. Burris (1924–1927)
Lemuel Arthur Pittenger (1927–1942)
Winfred Ethestal Wagoner (1943–1945) *
John Richard Emens (1945–1968)
John J. Pruis (1968–1978)
Richard W. Burkhardt (1978–1979) *
Jerry M. Anderson (1979–1981)
Robert P. Bell (1981–1984)
John E. Worthen (1984–2000)
Blaine A. Brownell (2000–2004)
Beverley J. Pitts (2004) *
Jo Ann M. Gora (2004–2014)
Paul W. Ferguson (2014–2016)
Terry S. King (2016–2017) *
Geoffrey S. Mearns (2017– )

*  Interim president

External links
Past presidents of Ball State University

Ball State University

Ball State